Shahbajpur railway station is a railway station situated in Barlekha Upazila of Moulvibazar District in Bangladesh. It was opened in 1910 on Kulaura–Shahbajpur line. There are two types of rail lines in Bangladesh Meter gauge and Broad gauge. This station is connected with meter-gauge link on both sides from Kulaura–Shahbajpur line and Akhaura-Kulaura-Chhatak Line by Kulaura Junction. This railway station is situated in Moulvibazar city.

History
In response to the demands of the Assam tea planters for a railway link to Chittagong port, Assam Bengal Railway started construction of a railway track on the eastern side of Bengal in 1891. A  track between Chittagong and Comilla was opened to traffic in 1895. The Comilla–Akhaura–Kulaura–Badarpur section was opened in 1896–98 and extended to Lumding by 1903.

The Kulaura-Sylhet section was opened 1912–15, the Shaistaganj-Habiganj branch line in 1928, the Shaistaganj–Balla branch line in 1929 and the Sylhet–Chhatak Bazar line in 1954.

A metre gauge link exists between Shahbajpur in Bangladesh and Mahisasan in India.

References

Railway stations opened in 1910
Moulvibazar District
Railway stations in Sylhet Division
Former railway stations in Bangladesh